Springville is an unincorporated community in Big Spring Township, Seneca County, Ohio, United States.

History
Springville was laid out in 1834 on the site of a former Indian village. The community was named for a spring near the original town site. A post office called Springville was established in 1836, and remained in operation until 1847.

References

Populated places in Seneca County, Ohio